Daniil Sergeyevich Ivankov (born 29 August 1999) is a Russian football player.

Club career
He made his debut in the Russian Football National League for FC SKA-Khabarovsk on 1 August 2020 in a game against FC Alania Vladikavkaz, he started the game and scored a goal on his FNL debut.

References

External links
 
 Profile by Russian Football National League
 

1999 births
Sportspeople from Rostov-on-Don
Living people
Russian footballers
Association football midfielders
FC SKA Rostov-on-Don players
FC SKA-Khabarovsk players
Russian First League players
Russian Second League players